"Rodeo" is a song by American rappers Lil Nas X and Cardi B from the former's second EP, 7 (2019). The song was written by the artists alongside Pardison Fontaine and producers Take a Daytrip, Roy Lenzo, and Russ Chell. Due to the song's interpolation of Heart's 1977 song "Barracuda," band members Ann Wilson, Nancy Wilson, Michael Derosier, and Roger Fisher are also credited as songwriters. Musically, the song is a country trap track with a surf trumpet and reverberated staccato guitar riff. The song received generally positive reviews from music critics, who praised Cardi B's verse.

"Rodeo" debuted at number 22 on the US Billboard Hot 100, and reached charts in numerous other territories. Lil Nas X and Cardi B, among others, were sued by Don Lee and Glen Keith DeMeritt III, with the two of them claiming that "Rodeo" plagiarized a track they produced called "Broad Day" (2017). A remix of the former with Lil Nas X and American rapper Nas was released for digital download and streaming as a single on January 27, 2020, after a live performance by Lil Nas X and Nas of the remix during the 2020 Grammy Awards the previous day. It was supported by a music video and caused the song to re-enter the Billboard Hot 100 at number 74, with the magazine billing the artist as "Lil Nas X featuring Cardi B or Nas".

Background and composition
According to Take a Daytrip, the duo of David Biral and Denzel Baptiste, the guitar lick for "Rodeo" was introduced during Lil Nas X's first studio session ever. The song's chorus was the first part the three of them completed, which was posted to Lil Nas X's Instagram before the rest of the song was finished, and had received around three million views within two days. A solo version of it was completed one month and a half later in New York City. Cardi B's verse was a late addition to "Rodeo", which Lil Nas X texted to the producers when they "were in the studio working on something else" a few days prior. The song was written by Lil Nas X and Cardi B, alongside Pardison Fontaine, Roy Lenzo, Russ Chell, Biral, and Baptiste, while the latter four produced the song.

Lil Nas X revealed the song's name as part of the tracklist for 7. Cardi B's appearance on it was not announced until the EP's release on June 21, 2019. A hip hop song, "Rodeo" retains Lil Nas X's "country trap style with twanging guitars" according to Spins Nina Braca. The song samples a guitar riff, described by Uproxxs Aaron Williams as "a harder rock-oriented loop" similar to Heart's "Barracuda" (1977), featuring Lil Nas X's country trap vocals, which Williams thought were "to censure a romantic flame for her dependence on his largesse". It includes a reverbed staccato guitar riff and surf trumpet. With "twisted, brooding Mariachi tones", "Rodeo" has a hint of guitar-and-drum driven heaviness.

Reception
"Rodeo" was met with generally positive reviews from music critics. Pitchforks Alphonse Pierre wrote that "'Rodeo' hits all the beats of 'Mo Bamba'" (2017), describing the former as "a desperate return to the bulletproof cowboy persona". Nina Braca from Spin labelled Cardi B's verse "energetic". NPRs Meaghan Garvey called the song "an outlaw banger", noting that it sees Lil Nas X's "cartoon cowboy drawl" return. In a review for AllMusic, Fred Thomas wrote that the song gets closest to the "trappy country" formula, with Lil Nas X "affecting his rugged cowboy persona over a banging beat, complete with a dusty drawl and a burning feature from Cardi B". Garrett Gravley of Consequence of Sound compared the quality of the backing instrumentals of "Rodeo" to Dick Dale, adding that it "leave[s] a void in the listener that can only be filled by playing [it] again and again". Rolling Stones Brittany Spanos described the song as a "surefire hit". In a mixed review, Erika Marie of HotNewHipHop thought that the song "brings more of a hip hop vibe with Cardi's aggressive rap addition, but with only two verses, there's much to be left for listeners".

Copyright claim
Don Lee and Glen Keith DeMeritt III sued Lil Nas X, Cardi B, Take a Daytrip, Unxque and Sony Music Entertainment for allegedly plagiarizing "Rodeo" from a song they produced called "Broad Day" (2017). Lee and DeMeritt stated that the former uses the E, F, G, F, E chord progression of the song and features similar instrumentation to it; they also alleged that the song was "performed, published, and distributed widely, including without limitation in and around the Atlanta hip-hop scene". Lil Nas X denied the claims and said that "the work, 'Rodeo,' was created independently from and without knowledge of the allegedly infringed work".

Commercial performance
"Rodeo" debuted at number 22 on the US Billboard Hot 100 for the issue date of July 6, 2019, following the release of 7. The track was later certified platinum by the Recording Industry Association of America (RIAA) for shipments of a million certified units on February 19, 2020. In Canada, it peaked at number 44 on the Canadian Hot 100 and attained a double platinum certification from Music Canada (MC). The track charted at number 55 on the UK Singles Chart, number 35 on the Irish Singles Chart and number 13 on Latvia's Mūzikas Patēriņa Tops chart. The song peaked at number 72 on the ARIA Singles chart and number six on the New Zealand Hot Singles chart, an extension to the New Zealand Top 40 Singles chart.

Credits and personnel
Credits adapted from Tidal.
 Lil Nas Xlead vocals, songwriting
 Cardi Blead vocals, songwriting
 Roy Lenzosongwriting, production
 Russ Chellsongwriting, production
 Take a Daytripsongwriting, production
 Jorden Thorpesongwriting
 Ann Wilson - songwriting
 Michael Derosier - songwriting
 Nancy Wilson - songwriting
 Roger Fisher - songwriting
 Denzel Baptisterecording
 DJ Swivelmixing
 Colin Leonardmastering

Charts

Weekly charts

Year-end charts

Certifications

Remix 

A remix of "Rodeo" by Lil Nas X featuring American rapper Nas was released for digital download and streaming in various countries on January 27, 2020, accompanied by an animated lyric video. Lil Nas X said of the collaboration that it was "amazing" for Nas to acknowledge him. The remix was serviced as a single to contemporary hit radio in Italy on January 31, 2020. Nas' verse features him rapping about his "ho stable" and major catalog. Stereogums Tom Breihan called it just as catchy as the original version, stating that the remix adds mariachi horns to its rumbling surf-guitar beat. Lil Nas X performed the former alongside Nas at the 62nd Annual Grammy Awards a day before its digital release.

Chart performance
The remix reached number 29 on Belgium's Ultratip Flanders chart and number 16 on the country's Ultratip Wallonia chart. It peaked at number 27 on the New Zealand Hot Singles chart and number 74 on the US Billboard Hot 100, with the magazine billing the artist as "Lil Nas X featuring Cardi B or Nas".

Music video
On February 4, 2020, Lil Nas X revealed that the music video for "Rodeo" will be released the following day, along with a selfie of him as a vampire with red dilated pupils and pointy ears from the shoot. The former was directed by Bradley & Pablo and released for the remix of the song. The video begins with Lil Nas X receiving a phone call about playing a game, following which he is bitten by a vampire and begins to evolve. Lil Nas X is then thrown into the matrix, where Nas shows up in a leather jacket and sunglasses. He offers the former a choice between two pills, who chooses the red pill over the blue one and unlocks his superpowers. About Cardi B's absence from the visual, Lil Nas X stated that she could not appear because of timing conflicts.

Trey Alston of MTV News called it "fully outrageous" and "the music video of your dreams". He added that the "weird" video is "one of the most wickedly original things you'll see". According to Consequence of Sounds Ben Kaye, the visuals continue Lil Nas X's "penchant for genre-specific visuals" and "scare up some vampire horror", but the video cannot decide if it wants to be The Lost Boys, Blade or The Matrix. Writing for Teen Vogue, Sara Delgado stated that the music video is a "cinematic masterpiece" and a "pop culture references galore".

Charts

Release history

References

External links
 
  
 

2019 songs
2020 singles
American country music songs
Cardi B songs
Country rap songs
Lil Nas X songs
Nas songs
Songs involved in plagiarism controversies
Songs written by Cardi B
Songs written by Lil Nas X
Songs written by Nas
Songs written by Pardison Fontaine
Song recordings produced by Take a Daytrip